Altin Çuko (born 21 June 1974) is a former Albanian football player who is best known for winning the Albanian Superliga Golden Boot, scoring 21 goals during the 1995-96 campaign, 5 with Tomori Berat and 16 with KF Laçi.

Not renown by a prolific scoring record, Çuko scored a remarkable 7 goals in Laçis final two matches to finish top of the goalscorers chart ahead of Shpëtim Kateshi who scored an even more remarkable 12 in Shkumbini Peqins final 5 matches, 7 of those also in the final two games.

References

1974 births
Living people
Association football forwards
Albanian footballers
KS Lushnja players
KF Laçi players
FK Tomori Berat players
Kategoria Superiore players